Emery J. Hengel (October 7, 1857 – December 11, 1924) was a Major League Baseball second baseman.  A native of Chicago, Illinois, he played for the Chicago Browns (1884) and the St. Paul Saints (1884), both of the Union Association, and for the National League Buffalo Bisons (1885).

Hengel was an average fielder and a poor hitter during his short major league career.  In 35 total games he was just 24-for-133 (.180) with thirteen runs scored.  Two of his famous teammates on the Buffalo Bisons were Hall of Famers Dan Brouthers and Pud Galvin.

Hengle died in River Forest, Illinois, at the age of 67. A brother, Ed Hengel, was a major league manager and umpire.

References

External links

1857 births
1924 deaths
Major League Baseball second basemen
19th-century baseball players
Chicago Browns/Pittsburgh Stogies players
St. Paul Apostles players
Utica Pent Ups players
Kansas City Cowboys (minor league) players
Chicago Maroons players
Minneapolis Millers (baseball) players
Indianapolis Hoosiers (minor league) players
Omaha Omahogs players
Ishpeming-Nagaunee Unions players
Buffalo Bisons (NL) players
St. Paul Saints (UA) players
Baseball players from Chicago